Silvia Zanardi (born 3 March 2000) is an Italian professional racing cyclist, who currently rides for UCI Women's Continental Team .

Major results
2020
 4th La Périgord Ladies 
 9th Vuelta CV Feminas 
2021
 1st  Road race, UEC European Under-23 Road Championships
 3rd Grand Prix du Morbihan Féminin 
 3rd La Choralis Fourmies Féminine 
 5th Giro dell'Emilia Internazionale Donne Elite 
 6th La Classique Morbihan 
 10th Tour de Belle Isle en Terre - Kreiz Breizh Elites Dames 
2022 
 1st  Youth Classification Setmana Valenciana-Volta Comunitat Valenciana Fémines 
 Tour Cycliste Féminin International de l'Ardèche
1st  Points classification
 1st Stage 6
 1st Visegrad 4 Ladies Series - Hungary 
 1st Stage 3 Tour Féminin International des Pyrénées 
 3rd Trofeo Oro in Euro–Women's Bike Race
 3rd Visegrad 4 Ladies Race Slovakia 
 5th Ronde de Mouscron 
 6th Memorial Monica Bandini 
 8th Overall Setmana Ciclista Valenciana 
1st  Young rider classification
 10th Gran Premio della Liberazione
2023 
 7th Trofeo Oro in Euro–Women's Bike Race

References

External links
 

2000 births
Living people
Italian female cyclists
Sportspeople from the Province of Piacenza
Cyclists from Emilia-Romagna